Dusocin  is a village in the administrative district of Gmina Grudziądz, within Grudziądz County, Kuyavian-Pomeranian Voivodeship, in north-central Poland. It is located in the Chełmno Land in the historic region of Pomerania.

Notable residents
Ludwik Rydygier (1850–1920), renown Polish surgeon and professor of medicine

References

Dusocin